The Church of las Calatravas (Spanish: Iglesia de las Calatravas) is a church located in Madrid, Spain. It was declared Bien de Interés Cultural in 1995. The external façade was revamped in 1866 following a project by Juan de Madrazo.

See also
Catholic Church in Spain
List of oldest church buildings

References 

Calatravas
Bien de Interés Cultural landmarks in Madrid
Calle de Alcalá
Baroque architecture in Madrid
17th-century Roman Catholic church buildings in Spain
Buildings and structures in Cortes neighborhood, Madrid